John Peter Gabriel Muhlenberg (October 1, 1746October 1, 1807) was an American clergyman and Continental Army soldier during the American Revolutionary War.

A member of Pennsylvania's prominent Muhlenberg family political dynasty, he became a respected figure in the newly independent United States as a Lutheran minister and member of the United States House of Representatives and United States Senate.

Early life and education
Muhlenberg was born October 1, 1746, in Trappe in the Province of Pennsylvania to Anna Maria Weiser, the daughter of Pennsylvania Dutch pioneer and diplomat Conrad Weiser, and Henry Muhlenberg a German Lutheran pastor. He was sent, together with his brothers, Frederick Augustus and Gotthilf Henry Ernst in 1763 to Halle. They were educated in Latin at the Francke Foundations.  He left school in 1767 to start as a sales assistant in Lübeck, but returned that same year to Pennsylvania.

Career
He served briefly in the British 60th Regiment of Foot, and also served briefly in the German dragoons, earning the nickname "Teufel Piet" (Devil Pete) before returning to Philadelphia in 1767, where he was given a classical education from the Academy of Philadelphia (the modern University of Pennsylvania).  He was ordained in 1768 and headed a Lutheran congregation in Bedminster, New Jersey, before moving to Woodstock, Virginia.

Muhlenberg visited England in 1772 and was ordained into the priesthood of  the Anglican Church, although he served a Lutheran congregation. Since the Anglican Church was the state church of Virginia, he was required to be ordained in an Anglican church in order to serve a congregation in Virginia. Besides his new congregation, he led the Committee of Safety and Correspondence for Dunmore County, Virginia. He was elected to the House of Burgesses in 1774, and was a delegate to the First Virginia Convention. He owned slaves.

Military career
Toward the end of 1775, Muhlenberg was authorized to raise and command as its colonel the 8th Virginia Regiment of the Continental Army. After George Washington personally asked him to accept this task, he agreed. However, his brother Fredrick Augustus Muhlenberg, who was also a minister, did not approve of him going into the army until the British burned down his own church in front of him. Then he  joined the military himself.

According to a biography written by his great-nephew in the mid-19th century,
on January 21, 1776 in the Lutheran church in Woodstock, Virginia, Reverend Muhlenberg took his sermon text from the third chapter Ecclesiastes, which starts with "To every thing there is a season..."; after reading the eighth verse, "a time of war, and a time of peace," he declared, "And this is the time of war," removing his clerical robe to reveal his Colonel's uniform. Outside the church door the drums began to roll as men turned to kiss their wives and then walked down the aisle to enlist, and within half an hour, 162 men were enrolled. The next day he led out 300 men from the county to form the nucleus of the 8th Virginia Regiment. Though it is accepted that Muhlenberg helped form and lead the 8th, historians doubt the account of the sermon, as there are no reports prior to Muhlenberg's great-nephew's biography.

Muhlenberg's unit was first posted to the South, to defend the coast of South Carolina and Georgia. In early 1777, the Eighth Regiment was sent north to join Washington's main army. Muhlenberg was made a brigadier general of the Virginia Line and commanded that Brigade in Nathanael Greene's division at Valley Forge. Muhlenberg saw service in the Battles of Brandywine, Germantown, and Monmouth. After Monmouth, most of the Virginia Line was sent to the far south, while General Muhlenberg was assigned to head up the defense of Virginia using mainly militia units.

At the Battle of Yorktown, he commanded the first brigade in Lafayette's Light Division. His brigade was part of the Corps of Light Infantry, consisting of the light infantry companies of the line regiments of Massachusetts (ten companies), Connecticut (five companies), New Hampshire (five companies), and Rhode Island and New Jersey (one each). They held the right flank and manned the two trenches built to move American cannons closer to Cornwallis' defenses. The battalion commanded by American Lt. Colonel Alexander Hamilton and French Lieutenant Colonel Jean-Joseph Sourbader de Gimat led the night bayonet attack that stormed Redoubt No. 10 on October 14, 1781.

At the end of the war (1783), he was brevetted to major general and settled in Montgomery County, Pennsylvania.

Muhlenberg was also an original member of the Pennsylvania Society of the Cincinnati.

Political career
After the war, Muhlenberg was elected to the Supreme Executive Council of the Commonwealth of Pennsylvania in 1784. He was elected Vice-President of the Council, a position comparable to that of Lieutenant Governor, on October 31, 1787. His term as Vice-President ended on a mysterious note. On October 14, 1788, the minutes of the Executive Council report that Muhlenberg had left Philadelphia without tendering his resignation—why his resignation was needed or expected is not noted—so a messenger was sent after him. That night, after the messenger returned with the resignation, the Council met at President Benjamin Franklin's home to choose Muhlenberg's successor, electing David Redick to the position.

Muhlenberg was elected to the 1st Congress (1789–1791) as one of the at-large representatives from Pennsylvania. His brother Frederick was the Speaker of the House for that same Congress. He was the first founder of the Democratic-Republican Societies in 1793. Muhlenberg served in Congress as a Republican during the 3rd Congress 1793–1795 and 5th Congress 1799–1801 for the 1st district. Muhlenberg was elected by the legislature to the U.S. Senate on a second ballot in February 1801 over George Logan, but resigned on June 30 of that same year.

President Thomas Jefferson appointed him the supervisor of revenue for Pennsylvania in 1801 and customs collector for Philadelphia in 1802. He served in the latter post until his death.

On August 3, 1805, Muhlenberg wrote a letter to the residents of the primarily-German Northampton and Berks counties in a successful attempt to tilt those counties toward incumbent Governor Thomas McKean, who, in the midst of a badly fractured state Republican Party, was running with Federalist support, in his bid for reelection. Muhlenberg noted that although McKean's opponent, Simon Snyder, was of German descent, his election would elevate the Republican Party's radical Democratic faction to power and, with calls for a Constitutional Convention to elevate the power of the state legislature over the governor and especially the judiciary, result in anarchy. McKean's margin of victory, 6,772-3,216, over Snyder in Northampton and Berks secured his narrow, 43,644-38,483, statewide margin of victory over Snyder.

Personal life
On November 6, 1770, he married Anna Barbara "Hannah" Meyer, the daughter of a successful potter. Together they had six children, including:

 Francis Swaine Muhlenberg (1795–1831), a U.S. Representative from Ohio who married Mary Barr Denny (1806–1893) in 1831, shortly before his death in December 1831.  After his death, Francis' widow married Richard Hubbell Hopkins.

On his 61st birthday, Muhlenberg died in Gray's Ferry, Pennsylvania, on October 1, 1807 and is buried at the Augustus Lutheran Church in Trappe, Pennsylvania.

Legacy

Muhlenberg is the namesake of Muhlenberg County, Kentucky.
A memorial to Peter Muhlenberg is located in Washington, DC on Connecticut Avenue (see image).
Another memorial to him stands behind the Philadelphia Museum of Art. 
Two statues of Peter Muhlenberg are located in front of the Shenandoah County Courthouse in Woodstock, Virginia, and the town's Emmanuel Lutheran congregation preserves communion vessels, a baptismal font and altar cloth that he used.
Muhlenberg College in Allentown, Pennsylvania displays a statue of John P. G. Muhlenberg in front of the Haas College Center, 2400 Chew Street.

References

Further reading
 Cecere, Michael. "The Fighting Parson's Farewell Sermon." Journal of the American Revolution, April 15, 2020.
Hocker, Edward W. The Fighting Parson of the American Revolution: A Biography of General Peter Muhlenberg, Lutheran Clergyman, Military Chieftain, and Political Leader (1936).
 Muhlenberg, Henry Augustus. The Life of Major-General Peter Muhlenberg: Of the Revolutionary Army (1849). online
 Rightmyer, Thomas Nelson. "The Holy Orders of Peter Muhlenberg." Historical Magazine of the Protestant Episcopal Church 30.3 (1961): 183-197. online

External links
Congressional Biography
National Statuary Hall Collection Biography
Biography and statue at the University of Pennsylvania
History Detectives: Muhlenberg Robe 

The 8th Virginia Regiment (history site)
 Society of the Cincinnati
 https://www.americanrevolutioninstitute.org/

1746 births
1807 deaths
People from Trappe, Pennsylvania
People of colonial Pennsylvania
Muhlenberg family
Pennsylvania Dutch people
Lutherans from Pennsylvania
Anti-Administration Party members of the United States House of Representatives from Pennsylvania
Democratic-Republican Party members of the United States House of Representatives from Pennsylvania
Democratic-Republican Party United States senators from Pennsylvania
American slave owners
University of Pennsylvania alumni
Clergy in the American Revolution
Continental Army generals
Continental Army officers from Virginia
People of Pennsylvania in the American Revolution
Burials in Pennsylvania
United States senators who owned slaves